Casimiro de Abreu Esporte Clube, also known simply as Casimiro de Abreu, or by the acronym CAEC, is a Brazilian football team from the city of Casimiro de Abreu, Rio de Janeiro state, founded on May 30, 1975.

History
Eleven athletes, dissatisfied with Independente Esporte Clube, left their club and founded an amateur club called Onze Tufões (meaning Eleven Hurricanes).

On May 30, 1975, with the help of Casimiro de Abreu's city hall, Casimiro de Abreu Esporte Clube was founded by the eleven athletes.

In 2000, Casimiro de Abreu professionalized its football section.

In 2002, the club won its first title, the Campeonato Carioca Módulo Especial, beating Artsul of Nova Iguaçu city in the final.

In 2003, CAEC signed a partnership with Grupo FMK.

Titles
Campeonato Carioca Second Division: 2000
Campeonato Carioca Third Division: 2002

Stadium
The home stadium Ubirajara de Almeida Reis, named after one of the club founders, has a capacity of 3,000 people. The stadium is nicknamed Caecão, which is the augmentative form of the club's acronym CAEC.

Colors
The official colors are yellow, blue and red.

Club kits
The home kit is all yellow, with details in red and blue in the shirt and in the shorts. The away kit is all blue.

Mascot
The team's mascot is called Poetinha (Little Poet) in reference to the famous poet that the city is named after, Casimiro de Abreu.

References

External links
Official Website
CAEC at FFERJ
CAEC de Abreu at RSSSF

 
Association football clubs established in 1975
Football clubs in Rio de Janeiro (state)
1975 establishments in Brazil